Wool railway station serves the village of Wool in Dorset, England. South Western Railway manages the station and operates all services.

History
When the Southampton and Dorchester Railway (S&DR) was opened on 1 June 1847, Wool was one of the original stations on the line.

The station was host to a Southern Railway camping coach from 1936 to 1939.

Two camping coaches were positioned here by the Southern Region from 1954 to 1960, the coaches were replaced in 1961 by two Pullman camping coaches until 1967. The coaches were fitted with a full kitchen, two sleeping compartments and a room with two single beds.

Accidents and incidents 

Services
Until 1967, trains through the station were normally steam hauled. Between 1967 and 1988, passenger services were normally provided by Class 33/1 diesel locomotives with Class 438 coaching stock (also known as 4-TC units). The line was electrified in 1988, using the standard British Rail Southern Region direct current third rail at 750 volts. Class 442 electric multiple units were initially used following electrification, until being displaced by new Class 444 electric multiple units in 2007.

There is a basic hourly service in each direction throughout the week, however peak times two trains an hour call in each direction on weekdays.

Bus services
The station also has 4 bus services linking it to Weymouth & Swanage.

Purbeck Breezer 
 30: Swanage - Weymouth / Dorchester (Limited Service) 
 31: Wool Rail Station - Lulworth Cove & Durdle Door

First Wessex 
 X54: Poole - Weymouth via Lulworth Cove
 X52: Bridport - Bovington via Weymouth

References

Railway stations in Dorset
Former London and South Western Railway stations
Railway stations in Great Britain opened in 1847
Railway stations served by South Western Railway
1847 establishments in England
DfT Category E stations